Recalcati is a surname of Italian origin. Notable people with the surname include:

Antonio Recalcati (1938–2022), Italian painter and sculptor
Carlo Recalcati (born 1945), Italian basketball coach and player

See also
Villa Recalcati, a rural palace in Varese, Italy

Italian-language surnames